Crystal Clarke (born ) is an American actress. She is best known for her roles as Tina Argyll in the BBC and Amazon Prime miniseries Ordeal by Innocence (2018) and Georgiana Lambe in the ITV and PBS adaptation of the Jane Austen novel Sanditon (2019–).

Early life
Clarke was born and raised in Essex County, New Jersey, to Caribbean parents; her mother is from Trinidad and her father was from Guyana. She has one older brother. Clarke attended Newark Arts High School, graduating in 2011. She also spent part of her childhood in Tennessee. Clarke made the decision to leave the United States to pursue acting because she felt her race and class put her at a disadvantage. Clarke moved to Glasgow to attend the Royal Conservatoire and graduated in 2014.

Career
Clarke made her West End theatre debut as Hester Worsley in Dominic Dromgoole's revival of A Woman of No Importance. She had small roles in the Force Awakens and Last Jedi installments of Star Wars. She, Lupita Nyong'o and Maisie Richardson-Sellers were the first three black actresses to appear in a Star Wars film in the former. She also appeared in the 2019 Black Mirror episode "Smithereens" and the Channel 5 film Agatha and the Curse of Ishtar.

Clarke played Tina Argyll in the 2018 mini-series adaptation of Agatha Christie's Ordeal by Innocence. In 2019, she began starring as Miss Georgiana Lambe in the ITV and Masterpiece adaptation of Jane Austen's novel Sanditon. Lambe is the only black character written by Austen. In 2022, she played Magali in The King's Daughter. She had a role in Sam Mendes' Empire of Light.

Filmography

Film

Television

Video games

Stage

References

External links 
 
 Crystal Clarke at Curtis Brown

Year of birth missing (living people)
Living people
21st-century American actresses
Alumni of the Royal Conservatoire of Scotland
American expatriate actresses in the United Kingdom
American stage actresses
American people of Trinidad and Tobago descent
American people of Guyanese descent
American television actresses
Newark Arts High School alumni
People from Essex County, New Jersey
Actresses from New Jersey